Pseudocoremia insignita is a species of moth in the family Geometridae. It is endemic to New Zealand. In 1988 J. S. Dugdale synonymised P. pergrata into this species, however in 2003 P. pergrata was reinstated as species separate from P. insignita.

References 

Boarmiini
Moths of New Zealand
Endemic fauna of New Zealand
Moths described in 1930
Taxa named by Alfred Philpott
Endemic moths of New Zealand